Britt-Marie Smedh (born March 22, 1955 in Solna Municipality, Stockholm County) is a former Swedish breaststroke swimmer who represented Stockholmspolisens IF. Smedh participated in the 1972 Summer Olympics, finishing 7th in the 100 m breaststroke, 10th in the 200 m breaststroke and 8th in the 4 × 100 m medley relay.

Smedh is mother to Swedish Olympic medalist Therese Alshammar.

Clubs
Stockholmspolisens IF

References
sports-reference

1955 births
Living people
Swimmers at the 1972 Summer Olympics
Olympic swimmers of Sweden
Swedish female breaststroke swimmers
Sportspeople from Stockholm County
20th-century Swedish women